Georg Anton von Rodenstein (29 September 1579 – 30 October 1652) was the Prince-Bishop of Worms from 1629 to 1652.

Biography

Georg Anton von Rodenstein was born in Rodenstein on 29 September 1579.  He became a canon of Speyer Cathedral in 1594.  Between 1594 and 1601, he studied at the University of Douai, the University of Poitiers, in Rome, and at the University of Siena.

He became a canon of Worms Cathedral in 1609, and was ordained as a priest in 1610.  He became a canon of Mainz Cathedral in 1612.  He became the dean of Speyer Cathedral in 1622.

On 20 August 1629 the cathedral chapter of Worms Cathedral elected him to be the new Prince-Bishop of Worms, with Pope Urban VIII confirming the appointment on 18 September 1630.

He became the dean of Mainz Cathedral in 1634 and the provost of Mainz Cathedral in 1638.

He died on 30 October 1652.

References

1579 births
1652 deaths
Roman Catholic bishops of Worms
University of Poitiers alumni
University of Siena alumni